Sosnovy Log is a rural locality (a village) in Nizhneiskushinsky Selsoviet, Belokataysky District, Bashkortostan, Russia. The population was 125 as of 2010. There are 4 streets.

Geography 
Sosnovy Log is located 29 km northwest of Novobelokatay (the district's administrative centre) by road. Nizhny Iskush is the nearest rural locality.

References 

Rural localities in Belokataysky District